Abd-Allah ibn Numayr (died 199 AH/814) was a narrator of hadith.

Name
His full name was al-Hafiz Muhammad Abdallah ibn Numayr al-Hamdani.

Legacy
He has been quoted in Sahih Muslim and by Maxime Rodinson

Sunni view
Ibn Hajar Asqalani in stated his Tahdhib al-Tahdhib that Abd-Allah ibn Numayr has been considered veracious (Arabic: thiqah) by Yahya ibn Ma'in, al-Ijli and Ibn Sa'd

See also
List of Islamic scholars

References

Year of birth missing
814 deaths
8th-century Muslim scholars of Islam